Ayumi Oka and Akiko Yonemura were the defending champions, but Oka chose not to participate. Yonemura partnered up with Maria Abramović, but lost in the first round to Ksenia Lykina and Melanie South 7–5, 4–6, [9–11].

Han Xinyun and Sun Shengnan won the title defeating Ksenia Lykina and Melanie South in the final 6–1, 6–0.

Seeds

Draw

References 
 Draw

Kurume Best Amenity International Women's Tennis - Doubles
Kurume Best Amenity Cup